Blood Wedding is a 1981 Spanish musical film written and directed  by Carlos Saura. It was directed and choreographed in the flamenco style. It is the first part of Saura's 1980s flamenco trilogy, and is followed by Carmen (1983) and El amor brujo (1986).

The film depicts Antonio Gades and his dance company performing a flamenco adaptation of Federico García Lorca's play Blood Wedding. As with all Saura's flamenco films, the film is overtly theatrical: it begins with the company arriving at the studio and putting on costumes and makeup. The dance is then performed in a bare windowed space with a minimum of props and no set. There are no elaborate costumes and many of the actors wear only their rehearsal clothes.

It was shown out of competition at the 1981 Cannes Film Festival.

Cast
 Antonio Gades as Leonardo
 Cristina Hoyos as Bride
 Juan Antonio Jiménez as Groom
 Pilar Cárdenas as Mother
 Carmen Villena as Wife

References

External links 
 

1981 films
1980s Spanish-language films
Films directed by Carlos Saura
1980s musical films
Flamenco films
1980s dance films
Spanish musical films
1980s Spanish films